ISO 4217 is a standard published by the International Organization for Standardization (ISO) that defines alpha codes and numeric codes for the representation of currencies and provides information about the relationships between individual currencies and their minor units. This data is published in three tables:
 Table A.1 – Current currency & funds code list
 Table A.2 – Current funds codes
 Table A.3 – List of codes for historic denominations of currencies & funds

The first edition of ISO 4217 was published in 1978. The tables, history and ongoing discussion are maintained by SIX Group on behalf of ISO and the Swiss Association for Standardization.

The ISO 4217 code list is used in banking and business globally. In many countries, the ISO 4217 alpha codes for the more common currencies are so well known publicly that exchange rates published in newspapers or posted in banks use only these to delineate the currencies, instead of translated currency names or ambiguous currency symbols. ISO 4217 alpha codes are used on airline tickets and international train tickets to remove any ambiguity about the price.

History 
In 1973, the ISO Technical Committee 68 decided to develop codes for the representation of currencies and funds for use in any application of trade, commerce or banking. At the 17th session (February 1978), the related UN/ECE Group of Experts agreed that the three-letter alphabetic codes for International Standard ISO 4217, "Codes for the representation of currencies and funds", would be suitable for use in international trade.

Over time, new currencies are created and old currencies are discontinued. Such changes usually originate from the formation of new countries, treaties between countries on shared currencies or monetary unions, or redenomination from an existing currency due to excessive inflation. As a result, the list of codes must be updated from time to time. The ISO 4217 maintenance agency is responsible for maintaining the list of codes.

Types of codes

National currencies 
In the case of national currencies, the first two letters of the alpha code are the two letters of the ISO 3166-1 alpha-2 country code and the third is usually the initial of the currency's main unit. So Japan's currency code is : "JP" for Japan and "Y" for yen. This eliminates the problem caused by the names dollar, franc, peso and pound being used in dozens of countries, each having significantly differing values. While in most cases the ISO code resembles an abbreviation of the currency's full English name, this is not always the case, as currencies such as the Algerian dinar, Aruban florin, Cayman dollar, renminbi, sterling and the Swiss franc have been assigned codes which do not closely resemble abbreviations of the official currency names.

In some cases, the third letter of the alpha code is not the initial letter of a currency unit name. There may be a number of reasons for this:
 It is considered important that the code of a completely new currency be highly mnemonic if possible. An example is the assignment of the code  to the euro. ISO 4217 amendment 94, which created this code, states "The code element 'EU' has been reserved by the ISO 3166 Maintenance Agency for use within ISO 4217 where 'R' has been appended to make an acceptable mnemonic code." Here the R comes from the third letter in the word "euro".
 The currency in question is replacing another currency of the same name, due to devaluation. So that the two currencies have different codes, a different third letter must be chosen for the code of the new currency. In some cases, the third letter is the initial for "new" in that country's language, to distinguish it from an older currency that was revalued; the code sometimes outlasts the usage of the term "new" itself (for example, the code for the Mexican peso is ). Another solution to a devalued currency having the same name as its predecessor is to choose a third letter which results in a 3-letter code with mnemonic significance.

X currencies (funds, precious metals, supranationals, other) 
In addition to codes for most active national currencies ISO 4217 provides codes for "supranational" currencies, procedural purposes, and several things which are "similar to" currencies:
 Codes for the precious metals gold (XAU), silver (XAG), palladium (XPD), and platinum (XPT) are formed by prefixing the element's chemical symbol with the letter "X".  These "currency units" are denominated as one troy ounce of the specified metal as opposed to "USD 1" or "EUR 1".
 The code XTS is reserved for use in testing.
 The code XXX is used to denote a "transaction" involving no currency.
 There are also codes specifying certain monetary instruments used in international finance, e.g. XDR is the symbol for special drawing right issued by the International Monetary Fund.
 The codes for most supranational currencies, such as the East Caribbean dollar, the CFP franc, the CFA franc BEAC and the CFA franc BCEAO. The predecessor to the euro, the European Currency Unit (ECU), had the code XEU.

The use of an initial letter "X" for these purposes is facilitated by the ISO 3166 rule that no official country code beginning with X will ever be assigned. 

The inclusion of EU (denoting the European Union) in the ISO 3166-1 reserved codes list allows the euro to be coded as EUR rather than assigned a code beginning with X, even though it is a supranational currency.

Numeric codes 
ISO 4217 also assigns a three-digit numeric code to each currency. This numeric code is usually the same as the numeric code assigned to the corresponding country by ISO 3166-1. For example, USD (United States dollar) has numeric code  which is also the ISO 3166-1 code for "US" (United States).

List of ISO 4217 currency codes

Active codes (List One)
The following is a list of active codes of official ISO 4217 currency names .
In the standard the values are called "alphabetic code", "numeric code", "minor unit", and "entity".

According to UN/CEFACT recommendation 9, paragraphs 8–9 ECE/TRADE/203, 1996:
 8. In applications where monetary resources associated with a currency (i.e. funds) need not be specified and where a field identifier indicating currency is used, the first two (leftmost) characters are sufficient to identify a currency—example: US for United States dollars for general, unspecified purposes where a field identifier indicating currency is present. (A field identifier can be a preprinted field heading in an aligned document or a similarly-agreed application in electronic transmission of data.)
 9. In applications where there is a need to distinguish between types of currencies, or where funds are required as in the banking environment, or where there is no field identifier, the third (rightmost) character of the alphabetic code is an indicator, preferably mnemonic, derived from the name of the major currency unit or fund—example: USD for general, unspecified purposes; USN for United States dollar next-day funds, and USS for funds which are immediately available for Federal Reserve transfer, withdrawal in cash or transfer in like funds (same-day funds). Since there is no need for such a distinction in international trade applications, the funds codes have not been included in the Annex to the present Recommendation.

Historical codes 
A number of currencies had official ISO 4217 currency codes and currency names until their replacement by another currency. The table below shows the ISO currency codes of former currencies and their common names (which do not always match the ISO 4217 names). That table has been introduced end 1988 by ISO.

Currency details

Minor unit fractions 

The 2008 (7th) edition of ISO 4217 says the following about minor units of currency:

Examples for the ratios of :1 and :1 include the United States dollar and the Bahraini dinar, for which the column headed "Minor unit" shows "2" and "3", respectively. , two currencies have non-decimal ratios, the Mauritanian ouguiya and the Malagasy ariary; in both cases the ratio is 5:1. For these, the "Minor unit" column shows the number "2". Some currencies, such as the Burundian franc, do not in practice have any minor currency unit at all. These show the number "0", as with currencies whose minor units are unused due to negligible value.

Code position in amount formatting  
The ISO standard does not regulate either the spacing, prefixing or suffixing in usage of currency codes. According however to the European Union's Publication Office, in English, Irish, Latvian and Maltese texts, the ISO 4217 code is to be followed by a hard space and the amount:

a sum of EUR 30
In Bulgarian, Croatian, Czech, Danish, Dutch, Estonian, Finnish, French, German, Greek, Hungarian, Italian, Lithuanian, Polish, Portuguese, Romanian, Slovak, Slovene, Spanish and Swedish the order is reversed; the amount is followed by a hard space and the ISO 4217 code:

Note that, as illustrated, the order is determined not by the currency but by the native language of the document context.

USD, USN: two US currency codes
The US dollar has two codes assigned: USD and USN ("US dollar next day"). The USS (same day) code is not in use any longer, and was removed from the list of active ISO 4217 codes in March 2014.

Non ISO 4217 currencies

Currencies without ISO 4217 currency codes
A number of active currencies do not have an ISO 4217 code, because they may be: (1) a minor currency pegged at par (1:1) to a larger currency, even if independently regulated, (2) a currency only used for commemorative banknotes or coins, or (3) a currency of an unrecognized or partially recognized state. These currencies include:
 Abkhazian apsar
 Alderney pound (1:1 pegged to sterling)
 Artsakh dram
 Cook Islands dollar (1:1 pegged to the New Zealand dollar)
 Faroese króna (1:1 pegged to the Danish krone)
 Guernsey pound (1:1 pegged to sterling)
 Isle of Man pound (1:1 pegged to sterling)
 Jersey pound (1:1 pegged to sterling)
 Kiribati dollar (1:1 pegged to the Australian dollar)
 Maltese scudo (1:0.24 pegged to the euro)
 Real Time Gross Settlement dollar (ZWL occasionally used)
 Sahrawi peseta (pegged to the euro), sometimes given the code "EHP" but this has not been assigned by the ISO
 Somaliland shilling (state of issue is viewed as de jure part of Somalia, exchange rate not fixed)
 Transnistrian ruble (state of issue is viewed as de jure part of Moldova)
 Tuvaluan dollar (1:1 pegged to the Australian dollar)
 Zimbabwean bonds
See :Category:Fixed exchange rate for a list of all currently pegged currencies.

Non-standard codes 
Despite having no presence or status in the standard, three letter acronyms that resemble ISO 4217 coding, are sometimes used locally or commercially to represent  currencies or currency instruments.

The following non-ISO codes were used in the past.

Unofficial codes for minor units of currency 
Minor units of currency (also known as currency subdivisions or currency subunits) are often used for pricing and trading stocks and other assets, such as energy, but are not assigned codes by ISO 4217. Two conventions for representing minor units are in widespread use:
 Replacing the third letter of the ISO 4217 Code of the parent currency with an upper-case "X". Examples are GBX for penny sterling, USX for the US Cent, EUX for the Euro Cent.
 Replacing the third letter of the ISO 4217 Code of the parent currency with the first letter of the name of a minor unit, using lower-case. Examples are GBp for Penny Sterling, USc for the US Cent, EUc for the Euro Cent.

A third convention is similar to the second one but uses an upper-case letter, e.g. ZAC for the South African Cent.

Cryptocurrencies 

Cryptocurrencies have not been assigned an ISO 4217 code. However, some cryptocurrencies and cryptocurrency exchanges use a three-letter acronym that resemble an ISO 4217 code.

See also 

 
 
 
 List of circulating currencies
 Tables of historical exchange rates to the United States dollar
 List of international trade topics

Notes

References

External links 
 
 (The official list of ISO 4217 alphabetic and numeric codes)
 An older list of ISO 4217 alphabetic codes that contains some history of ISO 4217 (PDF file)
 Position of the ISO code or euro sign in amounts
 List of all currencies with names and ISO 4217 codes in all languages and all data formats (Github)

 
Financial metadata
Encodings
International trade
04217
Financial regulation
Financial routing standards